The Greenville Bridge, or the Jesse Brent Memorial Bridge, is a cable-stayed bridge over the Mississippi River, in the United States, carrying US 82 and US 278 between Refuge, Mississippi, and Shives, Arkansas. When it opened in 2010, it was the fourth-longest cable-stayed bridge in North America.

The Benjamin G. Humphreys Bridge, the first bridge to connect the two towns, had become functionally obsolete. Its narrow road had only two lanes with no shoulders. Because of its location near a sharp bend in the Mississippi River, the bridge had become a hazard to river traffic; barges and towboats frequently collided with it. In 1994, a study concluded that a new bridge was needed and the old one should be torn down. Construction was begun in 2001 and the new bridge opened in 2010. In 2011, the process of removing the old bridge began.

Description
Opened in 2010, the Greenville Bridge carries US 82/278 over the Mississippi River between Refuge, Mississippi and Shives, Arkansas. It is located  down river from the original bridge, built in 1940. It has four fans of strand steel cable connected to the top of the towers which support the deck.

At the time of its opening, it was the fourth-longest cable-stayed bridge in North America.

Both the old and new bridges are geographically mostly in Arkansas, as the state lines were determined prior to the shift west of the Mississippi River.

History
The first Greenville Bridge was built by the company now known as HNTB and opened to much fanfare in 1940 as the "pathway to progress" for the Mississippi Delta. Until 1943, this was the longest bridge for vehicles on the Mississippi River. Over time, the bridge supported increasing volumes of highway traffic and vehicles hitting the bridge. In the 1950s, an Air Force plane crashed into the bridge. Though the bridge remained structurally sound, it was becoming functionally obsolete. It had only two narrow highway lanes and no shoulders. An accident or the crossing of very large vehicles such as a large combine could force the bridge to close.

With river traffic increasing, damage from barge collisions increased. By 1972, the Greenville Bridge was hit more times by barges than any other bridge on the Mississippi. The bridge was located close to a sharp bend in the Mississippi; towboats and barges had difficulty making the sharp turn and regaining their course in time to avoid a collision with the bridge. Over the years, many have not been able to make the turn quickly and have hit it. The bridge had become a danger to river traffic.

A 1994 engineering study by the Mississippi Department of Transportation explored alternatives to upgrading the crossing of US 82 and issued a report that explored a four-lane crossing at Greenville. It concluded the best of several alternatives it identified was to build a new bridge  downriver from the old one and to remove the old bridge. Additional studies evaluated the type of bridge to build, and by 1995 the cable-stayed bridge was chosen as the best design to fit the river and soil conditions, as well as providing sufficient clearance for river navigation. Engineering plans were completed in 1999. US 278 is panned to be relocated to the proposed Charles W. Dean Bridge when it gets built, completed, and opens to traffic.

Construction

HNTB, of Kansas City, Missouri, was the designer and consulting engineer for both the new bridge as well as the original Benjamin G. Humphreys Bridge. The federal government provided $110 million to begin building the main part of the bridge consisting long spans supported by cables. The main superstructure construction began in December 2001. Massman Construction Company in a joint venture with Traylor Brothers, Inc. received the contract to construct two large piers in the river; these were built using both floating caissons and open caisson construction. The construction on the last main span section of the bridge was finished in April 2006.

Building the approaches, including shorter spans of approach bridge work and structural support systems for the bridge, was the responsibility of each state. Construction of Arkansas'  approach of highway and bridge, costing $66 million, began in March 2006; Mississippi began its  approach in April 2006, costing almost $86 million. Hill Brothers Construction and Jensen Construction, in a joint venture with the Rasmussen Group, were awarded the contract for the eastern approach of US 82 in Greenville to the Mississippi River crossing. Hills Brothers Construction was awarded an $85.9 million contract to work on the road deck of the Mississippi approach to the bridge, the concrete footings, and the substructure and superstructure of that portion. The remaining contract, to apply a latex surface to the bridge, add stripes, tie US 82 into the approaches and dismantle the Humphreys Bridge, was awarded in January 2010.

It took sixteen years from the initial developing stage begun in 1994, until the Greenville Bridge opened to traffic on August 4, 2010. The entire cost of the bridge totaled $336 million. In 2011, the massive process of removing the old bridge by cutting it into small sections to be recycled was begun and was expected to be completed by September 2012. At times, the river has been closed to traffic to aid the demolition. The job was dangerous and at least two workers died during the demolition.

See also
 
 
 
 
 List of crossings of the Lower Mississippi River
 Charles W. Dean Bridge

References

External links
Greenville Bridge
Jensen Construction
HNTB Corp.
Massman Construction Co.
Traylor Bros., Inc.
News report video on bridge opening
 https://law.justia.com/codes/mississippi/2015/title-65/chapter-3/special-designations-of-portions-of-highway-system-and-bridges/section-65-3-71206

Transportation in Chicot County, Arkansas
Buildings and structures in Chicot County, Arkansas
Buildings and structures in Washington County, Mississippi
Road bridges in Arkansas
Road bridges in Mississippi
Towers in Arkansas
Bridges over the Mississippi River
Cable-stayed bridges in the United States
U.S. Route 82
U.S. Route 278
Bridges of the United States Numbered Highway System
Great River Road
Bridges completed in 2010
2010 establishments in Arkansas
2010 establishments in Mississippi
Steel bridges in the United States
Concrete bridges in the United States
Interstate vehicle bridges in the United States
Transportation in Washington County, Mississippi
Towers in Mississippi